A Place on Earth is a 2013 French / Belgian drama film directed by Fabienne Godet. Benoît Poelvoorde won the Magritte Award for Best Actor for his performance as Antoine Dumas.

Cast 
 Benoît Poelvoorde as Antoine Dumas
 Ariane Labed as Elena Morin
  as Matéo
  as Margot
 Marie-Armelle Deguy as Julia
 Thomas Coumans as Roman Morin
  as Maria
 Stéphanie Colpé as Maddy
 Brigitte Sy as Loraine Morin
 Jacques Spiesser as Monsieur Morin

References

External links 

2013 drama films
2013 films
Belgian drama films
French drama films
2010s French films
2010s French-language films
French-language Belgian films